WHMP (1400 AM) is a radio station broadcasting a news/talk format.  Licensed to Northampton, Massachusetts, it serves the Pioneer Valley.  It is currently owned by Saga Communications, and is repeated on WHMQ (1240 AM) in Greenfield, Massachusetts.

In February 2014, WHMP on weekdays, is broadcasting a mix of general interest and politically progressive oriented talk shows. These include the Kim Komando tech gadgets show, Wall Street Journal This Morning, the Ed Schultz Show, and the Thom Hartmann Show.

WHNP and WHMQ previously simulcast sister FM stations; WHNP was a simulcast of WAQY-FM (as WAQY, WMRE, and WPNT) until 2000 (it carried a promotional loop for Six Flags New England for several months after dropping the WAQY simulcast), while WHMQ repeated WHAI-FM (as WHAI) until 2001.

The three stations constitute part of a network of progressive talk stations throughout the northeastern United States that are owned by Saga Communications (others include WNYY in Ithaca, New York and WKVT in Brattleboro, Vermont); these, in turn, were among the last progressive talk stations still on the air in early 2017. Because of the migration of most progressive talk shows to off-air platforms, Saga announced plans to begin dropping the format in February 2017; WNYY will be the first to change, with most of the other stations in the network likely to follow. As part of the expected format change, WHNP will receive WNYY's translator under a policy that allows translators to be moved up to 250 miles from their original city of license.

On February 3, 2017 WHNP dropped out of the simulcast with WHMP and switched to a simulcast of WLZX-FM 99.3 under new WLZX calls.

As of September 2018, there have been claims that WAQY is supposedly simulcasting two sister stations over HD subchannels (i.e. WLZX via HD2 and WHMP via HD3).

Translators

References

External links

HMP
News and talk radio stations in the United States
Northampton, Massachusetts
Radio stations established in 1950
Mass media in Hampshire County, Massachusetts
Progressive talk radio